Khairul Alam Sabuj is a Bangladeshi actor, playwright and translator. As of 2020, he published four story books and wrote more than 35 television dramas. He received Bangla Academy Literary Award (2019) in the translation category by the Government of Bangladesh.

Early life and career
Sabuj grew up in Barisal and graduated in English literature from the University of Dhaka. was one of the leaders at Dhaka University Central Students' Union (DACSU).

Sabuj was a teacher in Libya in 1980.

Works
Sabuj translated Norwegian playwright  Henrik Ibsen's 12 plays into Bengali language.

Television
 Kothao Keu Nei (1990)
 Noashal (2004)
 Kajer Meye (2008)
 Mahanagar (2007)
 Mayur Bahon (2008)
 Asharey Golpo (2010)
 Shada Pata-e Kalo Daag (2010)

Theatre playwright
 Translation of The Dumb Waiter by Harold Pinter

Film
 Nondito Noroke
 Molla Barir Bou (2005)
 Meherjaan (2011)
 Horijupia (2015)
 Rupsha Nodir Banke (2020)
 Mujib: The Making of a Nation (2022)

Book
  Sophia Loren: Tar Apon Kotha (original Sophia Living & Loving: Her Own Story by A.E. Hotchner) (2003)

Personal life
Sabuj is married to Shirin Alam and together they have a daughter Protiti Purna.

References

External links
 

Living people
People from Barisal District
University of Dhaka alumni
Bangladeshi male stage actors
Bangladeshi male television actors
Bangladeshi male film actors
Bangladeshi translators
Recipients of Bangla Academy Award
Place of birth missing (living people)
Year of birth missing (living people)